The Pakistan women's national badminton team represents Pakistan in international badminton competitions. It is administered by the Pakistan Badminton Federation (PBF). Members of the team compete in singles, doubles, mixed doubles and team events at competitions including continental and regional games (Asian and South Asian Games) and continental championships.

Team Members

Results

Asian Games

Commonwealth Games

Islamic Solidarity Games

South Asian Games

Medals

References

Pakistan women's team
Women's national team
Badminton
Women's sport in Pakistan